Wolfgang Albers may refer to:

 Wolfgang Albers (politician) (born 1950), Die Linke politician in Berlin
 Wolfgang Albers (police president) (born 1955), former police chief of Cologne